Gulab Khandelwal (21 February 1924 – 2 July 2017) was an Indian poet who wrote poetry in different forms such as Lyrics, Sonnets, Rubais (Quatrains), Dohas (Couplets), Odes, Elegies, Lyrical Ballads, Epics, Poetic Dramas, Ghazals, and Masnavi with equal felicity. He even introduced some of these forms into Hindi literature and, apart from Hindi, has also written poetry in Urdu and English. The span of his poetic language touches upon Sanskrit on one end and Urdu on the other. Gulab Khandelwal died in Ohio on 2 July 2017.

Education
Gulab Khandelwal was born in the town of Navalgarh, Rajasthan (India). He spent his childhood and received his early education at Gaya, Bihar. He received his undergraduate education at the Banaras Hindu University, graduating with a BA in 1943. While in Banaras, his inborn poetic faculty matured when he came into contact with the great luminaries of Hindi Literature. He met poets such as Suryakant Tripathi 'Nirala', Maithili Sharan Gupt, Ayodhya Prasad Upadhyay 'Hariaudh', Harivansh Rai Bachchan, and Bedhab Banarasi. He also met critics such as Pt. Ramchandra Shukla, Nand Dulare Bajpai, and Pt. ShriNarayan Chaturvedi. Further early influences include scholars such as Dr. Sampurnanand, Kamlapati Tripathi, and Sitaram Chaturvedi.

Literary career
Gulab Khandelwal started writing poetry at an early age. His first volume of poems was published in 1941 with preface by the famous poet Suryakant Tripathi 'Nirala'. Since then, 73 books have been published, including more than 50 volumes of poems and 2 dramatic works in prose, some of which have been digitized by the Digital Library of India. Six of his books have received awards from the Uttar Pradesh government and one has received an award from the Bihar government. Some of his books were selected as textbooks for colleges in Uttar Pradesh and Bihar, with Alok Vritt used in the intermediate board in Uttar Pradesh, India, since 1976.

Mahakavi Gulab translated some of his poems in English in Gulab Khandelwal: Selected Poems, which was published in 1986 with preface by Dr. Karan Singh, ex-Prince of Kashmir. In recognition of this and his achievements in his literary career, he was awarded honorary citizenship of Baltimore City, USA on 13th July, 1985. Furthermore, both the mayor of the City of Baltimore and the governor of Maryland state declared this day as Hindi Day. 

Mahakavi Gulab was the president of Archana, a literary society of Kolkata founded in the 1950s, and presided over many events organized by multiple literary organizations. He was the president of Akhil Bhartiya Hindi Sahitya Sammelan, Prayag, for 18 years. He was also the president of Bharati Parishad, an organisation founded by Mahamana Madan Mohan Malaviya. For 15 years, he was the senior member of the editorial board of Vishwa, a literary magazine by the International Hindi Association. He was also the president of the International Hindi Association.

Mahakavi Gulab lived mostly in the USA, but visited India every year. Till his death, he was active in his literary pursuit. In addition to his involvement in the Indian literary organizations, he also worked extensively with Indian organizations in the United States. He presided on meetings in New York on Vishwa Hindi Sammelan, an organization which strives towards the firm establishment of the Hindi language. At the age of 82, he wrote his auto-biography ज़िन्दगी है कोई किताब नहीं (Zindagi Hai Koi Kitaab Nahi).

Awards
Some of his books were presented awards by Hindi Sansthan (U.P. Government), India
  Usha – by U.P. Government in 1967
  Roop Ki Dhoop – by U.P. Government in 1971
  Sau Gulab Khile – by U.P. Government in 1975
  Kuchh Aur Gulab – by U.P. Government in 1980
  Ahalya – Vishisht Puraskar by U.P. Government in 1980
  Har Subah Ek Taza Gulab – Nirala Puraskar by U.P. Government in 1989
  Adhunik Kavi-19 – Akhil Bharatiya Granth Puraskar by Bihar Government
  Ahalya – Akhil Bharatiya Rambhakti Puraskar by Hanuman Mandir Trust, Kolkata, 1984

Some of his books were selected as textbooks for colleges:
 Kach Devyani – Had been in Intermediate in Magadh University, Bihar (India)
 Usha (Mahakavya) – Had been in B.A. in Magadh University, Bihar (India)
 Ahalya (Khand-kavya) – Had been subject for dissertation in Awadh University, U.P. (India)
 Ahalya (Khand-kavya) – Had been in B.A. in Magadh University, Bihar (India)
 Alok-Vritt (Khand-kavya) – Had been in B.A. in Magadh University, Bihar (India)
 Alok-Vritt (Khand-kavya) – Is in Intermediate Board in Uttar Pradesh (India) since 1976

Research
A Dissertation For M.A. was presented by Mukul Khandelwal under the guidance of Shri Shyam Nandan Singh in 1978 from Magadh University and two dissertations were presented under the guidance of Shri Hans Raj Tripathi from Awadh University.
Degree of Ph. D has been awarded to the following persons on his literature:
 Sagar University, Madhya Pradesh to Yashvant Singh in 1966 (Hindi Ke Vaad-Mukt Kavi)
 Magadh University, Bihar to Ravindra Roy in 1985 (Gulab Khandelwal : Vyaktitva Aur Krititva)
 Meerut University, U.P. to Vishnu Prakash Mishra in 1992 (Gulab Khandelwal : Jeevan Aur Sahitya)
 Ruhelkhand University, U.P. to Poorti Avasthi in 1994 (Kavi Gulab Khandelwal Ke Sahitya Ka Alochnatmak Adhyayan)
 Mahatma Jyotiba Phule University, U.P. to Sneh Kumari Kanojiya in 2006 (Gulab Khandelwal Ke Kavya Ka ManoVaigyanik Adhyayan)
 Kurukshetra University, Haryana – Under the guidance of Shri Ramapati Singh in 2006
 Awadh University, Faizabad, U.P. to Ankita Mishra (Kavi Gulab Ki Kavya Drishti)
 Nagpur University, to Monika Vishnoi (Mahakavi Gulab Khandelwal Ki Kavya Bhasha Aur Shilp Vidhan)

Recognition
US and Canada
 Gulab Khandelwal was awarded the Honorary Citizenship of Baltimore City (USA) on 13 July 1985 "for his achievements and eminent gifts to our times.” This day was declared as Hindi Day in the entire state by the Governor of Maryland. The Mayor of Baltimore also declared this day as Hindi Day in the City of Baltimore.
 He was awarded the Vishisht Samman (Special Literary Award) by the Antar Rashtriya Hindi Samiti, Washington D.C. (USA) on 6 December 1986. 
 On Republic Day celebration of India, 2006, he was honoured and the title of 'Kavi Samrat' was bestowed upon him by the Governor of Maryland, USA.
 He has been honoured by Hindi Parishad Toronto and Edmonton (Canada) and has been honoured by numerous literary and non-literary institutions in India and USA.
 The Mahakavi Gulab Khandelwal Smriti Scholarship was hosted by the Institute for South Asia Studies at University of California, Berkeley in 2018, in support of research in Hindi literature. The $2000 award was given to Anirudh Karnick (a PhD student in Comparative Literature and Literary Theory at the University of Pennsylvania) in April 2019.

India
 Gulabji was felicitated by Uttar Pradesh Hindi Sahitya Sammelan in 1979.	
 He was conferred the highest honour of Sahitya Vachaspati (equivalent to the degree of PhD), by Akhil Bharatiya Hindi Sahitya Sammelan, under the president-ship of Padma Bhushan Dr. Ramkumar Verma, in 1989.
 His two books – Bhakti-Ganga and Tilak Kare Raghubeer, were released by the President of India, honourable Shri Shankar Dayal Sharma in 1997.
 He was felicitated jointly by the then Governor of U. P. Shri Vishnu Kant Shastri, Ex Chief Minister of U. P. Shri Mulayam Singh Yadav, Pujya Morari Bapu, and Ex Attorney General Shri Shanti Bhushan in Etawah, U.P, in 2001.

Music

Gulab Ji's Bhakti Geet and Ghazals are sung by many artists in India as well as the USA.

Works
Works of Gulab Khandelwal

References

External links
 Gulab Khandelwal at Kavita Kosh Hindi
 Gulab Khandelwal at Flickr Books
 Hail America by Gulab Khandelwal
Some Poems of Gulab Khandelwal
 Gulab Khandelwal in Open Library
 Gulab Khandelwal in Wikipedia Hindi गुलाब खंडेलवाल
 Watch Gulab Khandelwal Live
 Gulab Khandelwal Posthumous Site
 Mahakavi Gulab Khandelwal Smriti Scholarship
 Gulab Khandelwal Website

1924 births
2017 deaths
Indian male poets
Poets from Rajasthan
Indian male composers